Dictionary of Sex (also known as, Dictionary of Love) is a 1964 American erotic film directed by Radley Metzger.

Plot
Visual presentation of eroticism in a compilation format, which mainly included scenes from at least six mainstream European films, and involved some nudity and a 'love duet' dance sequence.

Cast 
 Pierre Brice ... (archive footage)
 Nicole Burgot ... (archive footage)
 Dora Doll ... (archive footage)
 Brigitte  ... (archive footage)
 Agnès Laurent ... (archive footage)
 Christian Marquand ... (archive footage)

Notes
According to one film reviewer, Radley Metzger's films, including those made during the Golden Age of Porn (1969–1984), are noted for their "lavish design, witty screenplays, and a penchant for the unusual camera angle". Another reviewer noted that his films were "highly artistic — and often cerebral ... and often featured gorgeous cinematography". Film and audio works by Metzger have been added to the permanent collection of the Museum of Modern Art (MoMA) in New York City.

See also
 Dictionary of Love

References

External links
 

American erotic drama films
Films directed by Radley Metzger
1964 films
1960s erotic drama films
1964 drama films
1960s English-language films
1960s American films